Doriprismatica tibboeli is a species of sea slug, a dorid nudibranch, a shell-less marine gastropod mollusk in the family Chromodorididae.

Distribution 
This species is found only in Sulawesi, Indonesia.

Description 
Doriprismatica tibboeli is similar in appearance to Doriprismatica atromarginata, but usually has a white, rather than yellow, body with no black line at the mantle edge.

References

Chromodorididae
Gastropods described in 2005